Chiche Atahaddak, is an Algerian game show of challenges and adventures, created by Kanzi Ben Aziza, produced by Ciné Rêve Production, and starring Fayçal Adjaimi. It airs every day during Ramadan, starting May 27, 2017, on Télévision Algérienne, Canal Algérie and A3.

Background 
Is a 9-minute program that combines watching and philanthropy, aimed at sick children, is based on highlighting known personalities to raise a muscle-based challenge and physical strength for this human cause.

Series overview

Episodes

References

External links 
 
 

Television in Algeria
Algerian television series
2010s Algerian television series
2017 Algerian television series debuts
Public Establishment of Television original programming